Waiapu Ward is a ward in the Gisborne District on the east coast of the North Island of New Zealand. It contains the towns Ruatoria, Te Puia Springs, and Tokomaru Bay. The majority of the ward lies within the Waiapu Valley.

References

Geography of the Gisborne District